Jean-Philippe Robin (11 May 1967 – 26 April 2015) was a former French para table tennis player who won multiple European team titles with Pascal Verger and Michel Peeters. He died of heart problems at the age of 47.

References

External links 

 
 

1967 births
2015 deaths
French male table tennis players
Paralympic table tennis players of France
Paralympic gold medalists for France
Paralympic silver medalists for France
Paralympic bronze medalists for France
Paralympic medalists in table tennis
Medalists at the 2000 Summer Paralympics
Medalists at the 2004 Summer Paralympics
Medalists at the 2008 Summer Paralympics
Medalists at the 2012 Summer Paralympics
Table tennis players at the 2000 Summer Paralympics
Table tennis players at the 2004 Summer Paralympics
Table tennis players at the 2008 Summer Paralympics
Table tennis players at the 2012 Summer Paralympics
21st-century French people
20th-century French people